Michael C. Johnston (born November 17, 1974) is an American educator and politician who served as the Colorado state senator from the 33rd district from 2009 to 2017. A member of the Democratic Party, he was a candidate for governor of Colorado in 2018, losing in the primary to Jared Polis, who went on to win the general election. He was also a candidate for the U.S. Senate in 2020, though he withdrew from the race in September 2019.

He is currently a candidate in the 2023 Denver mayoral election.

Early life and education

Born and raised in Vail, Colorado, Johnston is the son of former mayor Paul Johnston. After graduating from Vail Mountain School in 1993, he attended Yale University, earning his bachelor's degree in philosophy in 1997. During high school and college, he became involved in community service activities, including volunteering at a Denver homeless shelter and mentoring youth in a New Haven housing project.

After graduating from college, Johnston taught English at Greenville High School in rural Mississippi for two years as part of the Teach For America program. Based on this experience, he wrote the book In the Deep Heart's Core. After his program ended, he enrolled in the Harvard Graduate School of Education, earning a master's degree in education policy. While at Harvard, he worked with Al Gore's education advisor, Jon Schnur. With Schnur and others, he helped to found New Leaders for New Schools, an organization dedicated to training and recruiting leaders for urban schools. Upon earning his master's degree, he enrolled in Yale Law School, and became an education policy advisor to political candidates, including U.S. Senate candidate Tom Strickland in 2002.

Professional career 

After returning to Colorado in 2003, he was hired as principal at Joan Farley Academy. In 2004, he served as principal of the Marvin Foote Detention Center, which houses students in detention centers held in state custody, and organized the first high school graduation in the center's history. In 2005, Johnston taught education law at the University of Denver Law School and became the founding principal of Mapleton Expeditionary School of the Arts (MESA), a public school in Thornton, Colorado. As the school's principal, he helped to develop the school's curriculum and program as the school district shifted to developing smaller schools.

In the aftermath of Hurricane Katrina, Johnston helped lead an education summit in New Orleans and worked with U.S. Congressman George Miller on legislation to recruit and retain teachers. He joined Senator Barack Obama's presidential campaign as an informal advisor early in 2007; by May 2008, he was regarded as one of the campaign's key advisors on education issues. Obama delivered a major address on education from MESA in May 2008.  The school's achievements were highlighted in an October 2008 campaign advertisement.

Johnston has served on the boards of local and national education and service organizations, including the I Have A Dream Foundation, the Urban League, City Year, New Leaders, America Achieves, and America Succeeds. In 2010, he was featured in Forbes magazine's "7 Most Powerful Educators" and Time magazine's "40 Under 40".

Political career

Colorado Senate 
In April 2009, Johnston declared his candidacy for Colorado's 33rd Senate district, a historically African-American legislative seat based in northeastern Denver, after incumbent Peter Groff announced his resignation upon accepting an appointment in the Obama administration's Department of Education. Johnston cited education as the central motivation for his run, including the failure of a bill during the 2008 session granting in-state tuition to undocumented immigrants. During his campaign for the legislative appointment, he met personally with almost all members of the vacancy committee.

At the May 11 vacancy committee meeting, Johnston received 64 out of 126 votes in the first round of balloting to win the appointment, defeating former state representative Rosemary Marshall, Democratic National Committee member Anthony Graves, and activist Renee Blanchard. He was sworn into office on May 29, 2009. He was later elected in 2010 to complete the rest of Groff's term and was then re-elected in 2012, each time winning more than 82% of the vote. Due to term limits, this would be his last term in the state Senate.

Tenure 
While serving in the Senate, Johnston was assigned to the education and finance committees. He supported SB 10-191, legislation that modified teacher and principal accountability by measuring performance in part by student academic growth. The bill was signed into law by Governor Bill Ritter in May 2010.

Johnston worked on passing the READ Act, which was signed into law in May 2012. The law provides districts resources to help K-3 students struggling to read by establishing a process for districts to identify K-3 students who read below grade level and work with their parents to provide extra reading support before students reach the fourth grade. The bill also created the Early Literacy Grant Program to provide funding to districts for literacy assessments, professional development, instructional support, and appropriate interventions, and would distribute approximately $16 million to districts for use in one of three literacy support programs: full day kindergarten, tutoring services, or summer school.

Johnston was a co-sponsor of the ASSET bill, which allows students not legally entitled to be in the United States to pay in-state tuition at Colorado colleges and universities if they attend a Colorado high school for three years and graduate or earn a GED. Under previous law, students not legally entitled to be in the United States, who had graduated from Colorado high schools and had benefited from the state's investment in K-12 education were forced to pay out-of-state tuition. After languishing in the legislature for almost a decade, the bill passed and was signed into law by Governor John Hickenlooper in April 2013. "We come here today to close a chapter in American history, and to open a new one," Johnston remarked. "For me personally, there's no more significant bill that I've worked on that's going to make an actual impact on human beings."

2018 gubernatorial election

Johnston ran for governor of Colorado in 2018 to succeed John Hickenlooper, who was term-limited. He lost the Democratic primary election to U.S. Representative Jared Polis, finishing in third place overall. After the primary, he endorsed Polis as the Democratic nominee. Polis would go on to defeat Republican Walker Stapleton in the general election.

2020 U.S. Senate election

In January 2019, Johnston entered the race for the U.S. Senate seat held by Republican Cory Gardner. Johnston withdrew from the race in September 2019, a few weeks after former governor John Hickenlooper entered the race. Despite good fundraising numbers early in his campaign, Johnston cited the need for Democrats to avoid negative campaigning in the primary election as more important. Hickenlooper won the Democratic nomination and defeated Gardner in the general election.

2023 mayoral election 

Johnston is running for mayor of Denver in 2023. A nonpartisan blanket primary is scheduled for April 4, with a runoff on June 6 if necessary. The winner will succeed Michael Hancock, who is term-limited. His campaign is endorsed by The Denver Post.

Political positions
Johnston supported Proposition EE, which was approved in 2020 with nearly 68% of voters in favor. The referendum proposed increasing state taxes on nicotine products and expanding their scope to include vaping products. New revenues generated by the measure will be used to establish universal preschool, supplement public K–12 education, as well as fund other state priorities, such as housing development.

Personal life
Johnston lives in Central Park, Denver with his wife Courtney and their three children: Seamus, Emmet, and Ava. Courtney is a deputy district attorney who heads the juvenile unit of the Denver District Attorney's Office.

Electoral history

Publications

References

External links

 Mike Johnston for Mayor campaign website
 Legislative profile at the Colorado General Assembly
 Mike Johnston at On the Issues

1974 births
21st-century American educators
21st-century American male writers
21st-century American non-fiction writers
21st-century American politicians
American school principals
Candidates in the 2020 United States Senate elections
Democratic Party Colorado state senators
Founders of schools in the United States
Harvard Graduate School of Education alumni
Living people
People from Vail, Colorado
Politicians from Denver
Teach For America alumni
University of Denver faculty
Yale College alumni
Yale Law School alumni
Writers from Denver